literally means ninth street in Japanese.

Names 
 Kujō family, a Japanese kuge family and one of the five regent houses (go-sekke)

Places 
 Streets in Japan
 , one of numbered east–west streets in the ancient capital of Heian-kyō, present-day Kyoto
 Train stations in Japan:
 Kujō Station (Kyoto), a train station on the Kyoto Municipal Subway Karasuma Line in Minami-ku, Kyoto
 Kujō Station (Osaka), a train station on the Osaka Municipal Subway Chuo Line in Nishi-ku, Osaka
 Kujō Station (Nara), a train station on the Kintetsu Kashihara Line in Yamatokōriyama, Nara

See also 
 Cujo (disambiguation)